Jiro Wang  (born 24 August 1981)  is a Taiwanese singer and actor, who started his career as a model. Wang is a member of Taiwanese Mandopop vocal quartet boy band Fahrenheit.

Life
Jiro Wang was born August 24, 1981, in Taiwan. He graduated from Fu Shin Trade and Arts College with a degree in Advertising Design. Wang's father died when he was 18, leaving him and his mother stranded with the family debt. To pay off the enormous debt, Wang worked three jobs at a time, which variously included flyer distribution, dressing up as a mascot for Taipei's Zoo Mall, waiting tables at a bar, a fashion retail assistant, a part-time model, and even hard labor work as a construction worker. Upon graduation from arts college, he entered the commercial and modeling industry. BMG, the label that signed him, planned to package him with Jay Chou and Jordan Chan under the "3J Plan", but when BMG's stocks crashed following 9/11, the 3J plan was scrapped. Wang then decided to continue his career in the industry via commercial modeling and working backstage in fashion design. He was approached again around 2004, launching the start of his acting career.

He speaks fluent Taiwanese and Mandarin, and understands conversational English.

Wang used to play with an underground band named Karma and was their lead singer. Wang also composed the lyrics to their song, "人間逃亡記" (Rénjiān táowáng jì). The band later changed its name to Dong Cheng Wei (東城衛).

In 2013, between his filming commitments, Wang also held solo concerts in the cities of Osaka, Kyoto, and Tokyo in Japan, and Beijing and Shenzhen in China.

Apart from sharing work and lifestyle photographs, Wang uses his Weibo account to advocate various charitable causes, especially those relating to aiding aged war veterans (like Wang's own father) and elderly street hawkers, and animal welfare, amongst others. His early difficult financial circumstances made him a firm believer in helping those in need and the privilege of being able to give. Though he has used his celebrity status to aid charitable organizations such as Taiwan's Syinlu Social Welfare Foundation to raise funds and awareness for those with intellectual disabilities—such as shooting the micro-film entitled Seeing and designing packaging for the sale of their handicrafts—he remains largely low-profile about his personal charitable contributions. Some of his acts of goodwill only come to light when organizations publish a list of their donors, for instance.

On February 14, 2010, Wang started his own fashion label M JO <http://mjo.com.tw/index.html>. In line with its founding date on Valentine's Day, the label's slogan advocates, "Enjoy Love, Life, and Peace." As a design graduate with a passion for art, Wang personally designs the caps, clothing, and accessories, which are characterized by bold, vibrant and colorful designs. Wang, who is well known in the industry for his filial piety, credits his mother for his artistic gifts and love of design. She was a tailor / custom dressmaker and Wang learnt part of his craft from watching her work when he was young. He was partly motivated to create the fashion label as a gift to his mother. In 2014, Wang designed an exhibit for World Trade Centre (Hong Kong), in line with the 2014 FIFA World Cup, where Wang's artwork, M JO products, and his label's iconic JO robot were on display from 30 May – July 17, 2014. In 2014, Wang was invited to design the "M JO – JO Robot" series of virtual stickers/large-sized emoji for Line (application), making him the first Taiwanese celebrity to design purchasable stickers for the company. Using his fashion line M JO's iconic JO robot as his theme, he designed a series of 40 virtual stickers, which was released in LINE's sticker store on April 24, 2015.

Jiro Wang jointly invests in WoMen Hair, a stylish hair salon in Taipei, with his good friends and fellow Fahrenheit (Taiwanese band) mates, Calvin Chen and Wu Chun. On May 6, 2014, they attended the opening ceremony of WoMen Hair, which is run by their longtime friend and colleague, Sam Chen.

Wang's interest in art and Japanese manga includes a NT$10 million (approx. US$315,000) investment in exclusive agent rights for Chibi Maruko-chan merchandise in Taiwan. His love of the series began as a child, when he would hurry home after school to catch the television series over his meal-time. Through his friend Ivan Wang's introduction, Jiro Wang flew to Japan at the end of 2013 to meet with the manga artist, Momoko Sakura, creator of the series Chibi Maruko-chan. Momoko Sakura was impressed with Jiro Wang's gift of his personal artwork, which led to a collaboration featured in Chibi Maruko-chan'''s 30th anniversary publication entitled 《恭喜》, published both in Japanese and traditional Chinese. Jiro Wang and Momoko Sakura's collaboration is featured as part of the series' larger 30th anniversary exhibit, which was variously on display in Japan (August 6–20, 2014; December 27, 2014 – January 12, 2015) and Hong Kong (November 3, 2014 – January 4, 2015). In 2014, Jiro Wang and Ivan Wang established Toyu / 東友企業 (a synthesis of their Chinese names) and became exclusive agents for marketing Chibi Maruko-chan products in Taiwan. They have plans to make a Chibi Maruko-chan movie and Jiro Wang may possibly play Maruko's father or her classmate Kazuhiko Hanawa, depending on Maruko's age in the movie.

In his spare time, Wang takes an avid interest in putting Gundam models together and also in cosplayhttp://www.ettoday.net/news/20141126/431159.htm November 26, 2014. ETtoday (Chinese-language newspaper). Retrieved November 26, 2014.—a pastime he has enjoyed since his art school days, when he used to make his own costumes—and frequently shares photos on his Instagram and/or Weibo account in various roles as manga or anime characters, or Western superheroes, including Iron Man, Wolverine, Batman, and Captain America.

Career

Acting career

Wang is most well known as the male lead in the Taiwanese drama KO One (終極一班) (in which he plays the character Wang Da Dong, where he got his nickname, as it is quite similar to his real name, Wang Dong Cheng) and its sequel The X-Family. He is also known for roles such as Ah Jin in It Started with a Kiss, as Jin Xiu Yi in the live-action Taiwanese drama, Hana-Kimi (花樣少年少女), and Huang Tai Jing in the Taiwanese adaptation of Fabulous Boys (原來是是美男).

On May 3, 2011, it was announced that Wang has replaced Wu Chun as male lead, "Night Tenjo", in a live-action adaptation of Japanese manga series Absolute Boyfriend, with Korean actress Ku Hye-sun as "Riiko Izawa".

When Transformers: Age of Extinction launched an online Chinese casting contest for roles in four different categories in China during the summer of 2013, Wang emerged as the most popular contestant in the "Action Guy" category, from amongst 70,000 entrants. More than 500,000 people voted online for their favorite contenders, with Wang consistently in the lead for the "Action Guy" category, with more than 133,000 votes.ent.appledaily.com.tw/enews/article/entertainment/20130711/35142068 11 July 2013. Apple Daily (Taiwan). Retrieved July 11, 2013. Despite his popularity, Wang regretfully chose to eventually withdraw from the contest due to a conflict in KO One Re-act's filming schedule and Transformers 4's training schedule, choosing to honor his prior filming commitments in order not to hold up KO One Re-act's production team—which was still filming scenes and had already gone on-air in Taiwan and online in Mainland China. In his statement of withdrawal, published on the casting contest's website, Wang explained: "I'm immensely grateful for all the support I've received during the Transformers 4 casting contest and am truly fortunate to have emerged first in the "Action Guy" category. I've been a Transformers fan since I was little, and closely followed the first three installments of the movie. Upon learning that M1905 Movie Web was organizing a casting contest for Chinese actors, I signed up immediately, hoping to fulfill my childhood dream of going into battle alongside Bumblebee (Transformers). I was pleasantly surprised by the overwhelming wave of support and votes I received, and was overjoyed to receive notification from the organizers to begin the second round of training. Unfortunately, because I'm still in the midst of an ongoing, prior filming commitment, I have to honor those unfinished work commitments in order not to hold up the entire production team, and will thus have to regretfully give this training opportunity up."ent.appledaily.com.tw/realtime/article/entertainment/20130730/233660/汪東城退出《變形金剛4》培訓 July 30, 2013. Apple Daily (Taiwan). Retrieved July 30, 2013. During a media interview at a promotional event for the KO One Re-act television series, Wang reiterated his thanks for fans' warm support. Though his disappointment at the missed opportunity was palpable, he called the voting process a fantastic memory to have and to hold with his fans.udn.com/NEWS/ENTERTAINMENT/ENT2/8074741.shtml August 5, 2013. United Daily News. Retrieved August 5, 2013.

In 2014, Wang also became producer of the drama series The Crossing Hero (超級大英雄), in addition to his role as male lead. The series generated a buzz online prior to airtime: as of March 18, 2015, the topic #超级大英雄# (The Crossing Hero) was read more than 14 million times, with more than 39,000 people participating in the discussion on the popular Chinese micro-blogging site, Sina Weibo.Sina Weibo. Retrieved March 20, 2015. http://www.weibo.com/p/100808735f4dae52a3c7ef0b8a1bbd02f92225?k=%25E8%25B6%2585%25E7%25BA%25A7%25E5%25A4%25A7%25E8%258B%25B1%25E9%259B%2584&from=501&_from_=huati_topic The series hit 2.72 million views on its premiere episode within the first two hours, topping the "Hot Topics" list on Sina Weibo at the time. Viewership hit 4.33 million by the end of the first day on March 23, 2015.Enease (Chinese media statistics company). Retrieved March 24, 2015. http://www.weibo.com/3369552710/Ca2pt824s?type=repost

In 2016, Wang starred as the leading character Cao Yan Bing in the popular Chinese manga adaption live action series Rakshasa Street. With its airing on Youku (one of the most influential video website in China) on August 2, 2017, Rakshasa Street's viewership has reached 2.9 billion by November 22, 2017. The producer and Wang himself has also confirmed that season 2 is to be expected.

Music career

Wang was the first member to join Fahrenheit. He is the baritenor vocalist of the group. He is the one that usually has the rap part in most of the songs due to his fluency in the language. His publicized temperature is that of hot (热; rè) summer, at 95 Fahrenheit.

Wang released his first solo album What Are You Waiting For (Chinese:你在等什麼) on his 31st birthday, August 24, 2012.

Discography

Wang's new MV, "Exclusive Fort" (《專屬堡壘》)--theme song to the movie, Bloody Doll—was released on February 9, 2015.Yin Yue Tai.

Wang sings the opening theme song for his new drama series, The CrBloomsomero. ThBloomsoms entitled "The Great Hero" (《大英雄》) and an MV was released on March 15, 2015, one week before the online series goes on air on Tencent Video.

Other Solos

Filmography

 Films Security, which was filmed in Sofia, Bulgaria last November 2015, will be his first U.S. film.

Television Series

Awards

Solo Concerts
 May 31, 2013 in Osaka, Japan.
 June 1, 2013 in Kyoto, Japan.
 June 2, 2013 in Tokyo, Japan.
 September 7, 2013 in Beijing, China.
 November 23, 2013 in Shenzhen, China.

Television – Variety Programs (as co-host/regular guest)
 2010 : Super King (综艺大國民) : premieres June 19, 2010 : CTS
 2014 : Let's Sing, Kids (中國新聲代) : premieres May 31, 2014 : Hunan Broadcasting System
 2015 : Wonderful Life (精彩好生活) : premieres June 14, 2015 : Zhejiang Television
 2015 : Running Calorie (奔跑卡路里) : premieres June 19, 2015 : iQiyi
 2015 : Flying Man (冲上云霄) : premieres July 2015 : Liaoning Television
 2016: Run for Time (全员加速中第二季): premieres April 29, 2016: Hunan Broadcasting System

Guest appearances
Wang also performed in numerous MVs and commercials before his rise to stardom. He appeared in Fish Leong's (梁靜茹) 分手快樂 MV when he was 19. After the debut of Fahrenheit, he starred with fellow HIM International Music artists, including MVs for Tank (Taiwanese singer) and Liu Li Yang, such as Liu's Smiling Tears (眼淚笑了). Wang has appeared in numerous MVs for Tank, including "If I Was the Memory" (如果我變成回憶), "Give Me Your Love" (給我你的愛), and "KO One" (終極一班). He also features in various S.H.E MVs and Rolling Love co-star Genie Chuo's "Never Ending Rainbow" (Chinese:"永不消失的彩虹"). Wang also stars in his good friend and co-star Pets Tseng's first solo album MV, Just Lose It (不過失去了一點點), which was released on December 9, 2014, exceeding a million views within a month of its release, on both its official YouTube and YinYueTai (Chinese MV) platforms.

 November 27, 2006: Celebrity guest on Kangxi Lai Le to promote Hanazakarino Kimitachihe with fellow cast members Ella Chen, Wu Chun, and Danson Tang
 December 1, 2006: Celebrity guest on 100% Entertainment to promote Hanazakarino Kimitachihe with fellow cast members
 December 4, 2006: Celebrity guest on 我愛黑澀會 to promote Hanazakarino Kimitachihe with fellow cast members
 March 1, 2007: Celebrity guest on 100% Entertainment to promote Hanazakarino Kimitachihe with fellow cast members
 August 2, 2007: Celebrity guest on Kangxi Lai Le to promote The X-Family with fellow cast members
 August 6, 2007: Celebrity guest on 100% Entertainment to promote The X-Family with fellow cast members
 August 7, 2007: Celebrity guest on TVBS program, Queen (hosted by Pauline Lan) to promote The X-Family with fellow cast members
 August 7, 2007: Celebrity guest on 100% Entertainment to promote The X-Family with fellow cast members
 August 20, 2007: Celebrity guest on Gourmet Secrets of the Stars to promote The X-Family with fellow cast members
 May 5, 2008: Celebrity guest on 100% Entertainment with Danson Tang
 May 9, 2008: Celebrity guest on 100% Entertainment to promote Rolling Love with fellow cast members Genie Chuo and Danson Tang
 May 19, 2008: Celebrity guest on 100% Entertainment to promote Rolling Love with fellow cast members
 May 30, 2008: Celebrity guest on 命運好好玩 to promote Rolling Love with Genie Chuo
 February 10, 2009: Celebrity guest on 100% Entertainment to promote ToGetHer with fellow cast members George Hu and Rainie Yang
 February 20, 2009: Celebrity guest on 100% Entertainment to promote ToGetHer with fellow cast members 
 February 23, 2009: Celebrity guest on 東風娛樂通 to promote ToGetHer with fellow cast members
 February 25, 2009: Celebrity guest on 命運好好玩 to promote ToGetHer with fellow cast members
 March 23, 2009: Celebrity guest on Kangxi Lai Le to promote ToGetHer with fellow cast members 
 June 11, 2010: Celebrity guest on 百萬小學堂 to promote his pictorial book, Van Gogh and Me June 21, 2010: Celebrity guest on the entertainment program University to promote Van Gogh and Me July 4, 2010: Celebrity guest on 完全娛樂 to promote Van Gogh and Me July 6, 2010: Celebrity guest on 《佼個朋友吧》to promote Van Gogh and Me July 25, 2010: Celebrity guest on 《海爸王見王》(hosted by Allen Chao) to promote Van Gogh and Me August 21, 2010: Celebrity guest on Entertainment-News@Asia (hosted by Patty Hou) to promote Van Gogh and Me with Dong Cheng Wei
 December 16, 2010: Celebrity guest on 《我在你身邊》(hosted by He Jiong and Li Weijia) with Dylan Kuo and Danson Tang in Greece
 August 26, 2011: Celebrity guest on Youku to promote the film The Purple House with director Pan Heng Sheng
 August 27, 2011: Celebrity guest on 《范後感》to promote Van Gogh and Me  August 17, 2012: Celebrity guest on 百萬小學堂 to promote his solo album What Are You Waiting For
 August 19, 2012: Celebrity guest on Power Sunday to promote What Are You Waiting For
 August 25, 2012: Celebrity guest on Take Me Out, Taiwan to promote What Are You Waiting For
 August 30, 2012: Celebrity guest on 十點名人堂 (hosted by Harlem Yu) to promote What Are You Waiting For
 August 30, 2012: Celebrity guest on Kangxi Lai Le to promote What Are You Waiting For
 September 7, 2012: Celebrity guest on TVBS program, Queen (hosted by Pauline Lan) to promote What Are You Waiting For
 September 7, 2012: Celebrity guest on 100% Entertainment to promote What Are You Waiting For
 September 12, 2012: Celebrity guest on 《型男大主廚》 to promote What Are You Waiting For with Dylan Kuo
 October 14, 2012: Celebrity guest on 《今晚80后脱口秀》 to promote What Are You Waiting For
 October 20, 2012: Celebrity guest on Happy Camp (variety show) with Ruby Lin to promote their new drama series, Drama Go! Go! Go! 
 November 1, 2012: Celebrity guest on 《百变大咖秀》 with Ruby Lin to promote Drama Go! Go! Go! and What Are You Waiting For
 November 9, 2012: Celebrity guest on the variety program 《年代秀》 to promote What Are You Waiting For
 November 23, 2012: Celebrity guest on the variety program 《非常不一班》 to promote What Are You Waiting For
 December 25, 2012: Celebrity guest on 100% Entertainment to promote KO One Return with fellow cast members Pets Tseng and Hwang in Deok
 December 28, 2012: Celebrity guest on 100% Entertainment to promote KO One Return with fellow cast members
 January 3, 2013: Celebrity guest on 100% Entertainment to promote KO One Return with fellow cast members
 January 12, 2013: Celebrity guest on 100% Entertainment to promote KO One Return with fellow cast members
 July 13, 2013: Celebrity guest on 100% Entertainment to promote KO One Re-act with fellow cast members
 July 26, 2013: Celebrity guest on 100% Entertainment to promote KO One Re-act with female lead Pets Tseng
 October 3, 2013: Celebrity guest on Tencent program, 《幸福男女》 (hosted by Ah Ya (阿雅)) to promote his solo concert
 November 5, 2013:  Celebrity guest on TVBS program, Queen (hosted by Pauline Lan)
 November 23, 2013: Celebrity guest on Happy Camp (variety show) with Nicky Wu and Lu Yi (actor)
 December 15, 2013: Celebrity guest on the variety program《音樂無雙》(hosted by Calvin Chen)
 March 8, 2014: Celebrity guest on Hunan Television's 《疯狂的麦咭》
 March 22, 2014: Celebrity guest on Hunan Television's 《疯狂的麦咭》
 November 6, 2014: Celebrity guest on TVBS program, Queen (hosted by Pauline Lan)
 December 19, 2014: Celebrity guest on Hunan Television program, Grade One December 22, 2014: Celebrity guest on Hunan Television's web-based program,《偶像萬萬碎》
 January 3, 2015: Celebrity guest on Hunan Television's 《疯狂的麦咭》
 January 10, 2015: Celebrity guest on Happy Camp (variety show) to promote Singles Villa January 22, 2015: Celebrity guest on Hunan Television's variety program, Laugh Out Loud to promote Singles Villa February 25, 2015: Celebrity guest on Azio TV's program, City Color (hosted by Calvin Chen and Patty Hou)
 February 26, 2015: Celebrity guest on Azio TV's program, City Color (hosted by Calvin Chen and Patty Hou)
 February 27, 2015: Celebrity guest on Hunan Television's program, 《天天向上》
 April 6, 2015: Celebrity guest on Kangxi Lai Le
 April 16, 2015: Celebrity guest on ZheJiang Satellite TV's program, 青春练习生 (Youth Trainees) – leader of the Shenzhen station
 April 16, 2015: Celebrity guest on SS小燕之夜 to promote The Crossing Hero with Nikki Hsieh, Jimmy Hung, and Jeff Zhang
 April 17, 2015: Celebrity guest on Shenzhen Satellite TV's program, Men vs. Women (《男左女右》)
 April 18, 2015: Celebrity guest on 100% Entertainment to promote The Crossing Hero 
 April 23, 2015: Celebrity guest on ZheJiang Satellite TV's program, 青春练习生 (Youth Trainees) – leader of the Shenzhen station
 May 1, 2015: Celebrity guest on Taiwan's Public Television Services' program, Guess Who (《誰來晚餐》) 
 June 19, 2015: Celebrity guest on Jiangsu Television's program, The Exploration of the World – Japan stop

Publications
 June 9, 2010 : Van Gogh And Me – All About Jiro (梵谷與我：汪東城的字‧畫‧像) – . Jiro visited Amsterdam, the Netherlands for this book

Other events/appearances

 June 11, 2011: Promoting The Purple House at the Shanghai Film and Television Festival
 August 17, 2011: M JO and One Piece Crossover Show (Hong Kong)
 September 17, 2011: Vogue (magazine) Fashion Night Out (Taiwan)
 March 12, 2012: Promoting KO One Return at the Hong Kong International Film and Television press conference with Pets Tseng
 April 14, 2012: Absolute Darling promotional activities (Singapore)
 April 22, 2012: Autograph session for Absolute Darling OST
 April 27, 2012: Absolute Darling promotional activities (Taiwan)
 May 2, 2012: Guest performer at Dong Cheng Wei mini-concert
 April 26, 2012: American Eagle Outfitters event (Hong Kong)
 June 14, 2012: Promoting Drama Go! Go! Go! with Ruby Lin at the Shanghai Film and Television Festival
 November 24, 2012: Grand opening of An Ning Jewellery (Beijing, China)
 November 28, 2012: Premiere for the microfilm Seeing and launch of Syinlu's 799 philanthropic program (Taiwan)
 December 15, 2012: Sale of M JO Christmas limited edition at Miramar Shopping Centre (Hong Kong)
 December 31, 2012: New Year's Eve countdown performance (Guangzhou, China)
 January 1, 2013: Fan meeting and autograph session for his album, What Are You Waiting For (Shenzhen, Guangdong, China)
 January 26, 2013: Chivas Regal event (Chengdu, China)
 February 16, 2013: Guest at Pets Tseng's concert
 March 8, 2013: Isetan Samantha Thavasa event (Shanghai, China)
 March 10, 2013: KO One Return fan meeting (Taiwan) 
 March 23, 2013: SK-II event (Hangzhou, China)
 March 25, 2013: Media press conference for Drama Go! Go! Go! (Taiwan)
 March 30, 2013: Invited performer at 2013 Super Girls Festa (Live)
 April 18, 2013: KO One Re-act press conference (Taiwan) 
 April 20, 2013: Lovemore event (Hong Kong)
 April 21, 2013: Guest appearance at the media reception for GTV's new program (Taiwan)
 April 27, 2013: Chivas Regal event (Chongqing, China)
 May 2, 2013: Radio interview for Fabulous Boys 
 May 18, 2013: Lovemore event at Poya, Kaohsiung (Taiwan)
 June 8, 2013: Autograph session for Fabulous Boys OST (Taiwan)
 June 15, 2012: Promoting his new horror film Bloody Doll at the 16th Shanghai Film and Television Festival
 June 29, 2013: guest star at Rainie Yang's Genting Highlands concert (Malaysia)
 July 3, 2013: KO One Re-act press conference (Taiwan) 
 July 6, 2013: Invited guest at Tiger Beer's Battle of the Bands (Changzhou, China)
 July 20, 2013: Chivas Regal Mix Club with Dong Cheng Wei band members, Shu and Deng (Beijing, China)
 August 4, 2013: Promotional activities for KO One Re-act (Taiwan) 
 August 9, 2013: Guest performer at the Sprite Star Basketball Friendly Match 2013 with Kobe Bryant, Jay Chou, Wu Chun, and other Chinese celebrities (Shanghai, China)
 August 10, 2013: Wanda Mall's 1st anniversary celebrations (Jinjiang, Fujian, China)
 August 24, 2013: Birthday fan meeting (Taiwan)
 September 1, 2013: Grand opening of Luckycity (Tianjin, China)
 September 2, 2013: Evening Show with Dong Cheng Wei band members, Shu and Deng (Shenzhen, China)
 September 5, 2013: Youku interview – celebrating the online ratings success of KO One Re-act (Beijing, China)
 September 6, 2013: Pre-concert autograph session (Beijing, China)
 September 19, 2013: Mid-Autumn celebration at Wanda Mall (Dalian, China)
 September 27, 2013: Intime City's 4th anniversary celebrations (Zhejiang, China)
 October 2, 2013: Invited celebrity guest at the premiere of Young Detective Dee: Rise of the Sea Dragon October 26, 2013: Coca-Cola event (Wenzhou, China)
 November 7, 2013: Promotional activities for his film My Boyfriends (Chengdu, China)
 November 8, 2013: Promotional activities for his film My Boyfriends (Guangzhou, China)
 November 9, 2013: Promotional activities for his film My Boyfriends (Beijing, China)
 November 10, 2013: Pre-concert media press conference (Shenzhen, China)
 November 16, 2013: Promotional activities for Fabulous Boys OST (Japan)
 December 1, 2013: Invited guest – Freemore's Free Dance competition (Sichuan, Chengdu, China)
 December 3, 2013: Interview with Tencent as producer of drama series, The Crossing Hero (Shanghai, China)
 December 15, 2013: Clear event (Chongqing, China)
 December 19, 2013: Media press conference for My Broadcasting Girlfriend (Nantong, Jiangsu, China)
 December 22, 2013: Coca-Cola event (Zhengzhou, China)
 December 31, 2013: New Year's Eve countdown performance (Guangzhou, China)
 March 8, 2014: Taobao Shopping Fest at Central Walk Shopping Mall (Shenzhen, China)
 March 14, 2014: Lovemore event at Mannings (Guangzhou, China)
 April 15, 2014: Interview for his film My Broadcasting Girlfriend (Beijing, China)
 April 16, 2014: Media press conference for My Broadcasting Girlfriend (Beijing, China)
 April 16, 2014: Promoting My Broadcasting Girlfriend at the Beijing International Film Festival 
 April 26, 2014: Hot Lips, Hot Music at Forum 66 (Shenyang, China)
 May 6, 2014: Grand opening of WoMen Hair (Taipei, Taiwan)
 May 14, 2014: Promotional activities for My Broadcasting Girlfriend (Fuzhou, China)
 May 14, 2014: Promotional activities for My Broadcasting Girlfriend (Beijing, China)
 May 29, 2014: World Trade Centre (Hong Kong)
 June 29, 2014: Coca-Cola event (Fuzhou, Xiamen, China)
 October 27, 2014: H.Linx (Hangzhou, China)
 November 4, 2014: Media reception for the drama series Singles Villa (Changsha, China)
 November 22, 2014: Eral fashion label (Shenyang, China)
 November 29, 2014: Grand opening of Xiasha Powerlong Shopping Complex (Hangzhou, China)
 December 6, 2014: Zhongnan City Shopping Mall's 3rd anniversary celebrations (Nantong, Jiangsu, China)
 December 14, 2014: Celebrity guest at motor event 《中國飄移冠軍》 (Quanzhou, China)
 December 21, 2014: Grand opening of Powerlong Shopping Complex (Tianjin, China)
 December 24, 2014: Celebrity guest at Folli Follie event (Zhangjiagang, China)
 December 25, 2014: Celebrity guest at La Côrde Homme's Christmas event (Ningbo, China)
 December 28, 2014: Media press conference for Singles Villa (Changsha, China)
 December 31, 2014: Countdown Show 2015 at East Point City (Hong Kong)http://www.singpao.com/yl/mx/201412/t20141230_543351.html  Sing Pao Daily News December 30, 2014. (Hong Kong-based Chinese language newspaper). Retrieved December 31, 2014.
 January 1, 2015: Celebrity guest at Folli Follie event in Kaihong Mall (Zhoushan, Zhejiang, China)
 January 9, 2015: Celebrity guest at Happy New Nine event (Chengdu, China)
 January 17, 2015: Promoting the television serial, Singles Villa (Shanghai, China)
 February 6, 2015: Interview with Tencent Comic (Beijing, China)
 February 14, 2015: Celebrity guest at Wanda Movie Park's Valentine's Day event (Wuhan, China)
 March 7, 2015: SK-II event (Nanking, China)
 March 15, 2015: Press conference for Wang's new film with Jordan Chan, 《槑計劃》 (Shenzhen, China)
 March 20, 2015: Dragon Ball Z Special Exhibition: Science Fair (Songshan, Taipei, Taiwan)Xie, Zi Zhen. "Jiro Wang has fun playing with 'Wukong,' posted picture leads netizens to reminisce about their childhoods (汪東城與「悟空」玩high 微博曬照引網友憶童年)." Yes Entertainment (March 21, 2015). http://tw.twent.chinayes.com/Content/20150321/kkht4vnp7i0g4.shtml Nagoo TV (March 20, 2015). https://www.youtube.com/watch?v=MyQXXCSHKEw https://www.youtube.com/watch?v=bIqWklSmpyc https://www.youtube.com/watch?v=ihkhREKiGWM https://www.youtube.com/watch?v=9X9rgG7F8RE https://www.youtube.com/watch?v=b8E2nMbxF2w https://www.youtube.com/watch?v=vPFN0Ug2gd4 https://www.youtube.com/watch?v=4seB8qfc2tU https://www.youtube.com/watch?v=3E1z4Kb5Z1A https://www.youtube.com/watch?v=tAvVMblGNcw https://www.youtube.com/watch?v=uyZN71B1TPQ
 April 2, 2015: Press conference for The Crossing Hero (Taiwan)
 May 1, 2015: Celebrity guest at Suning Plaza's event (Chengdu, China)
 May 2, 2015: Celebrity guest at Suning Plaza's event (Wuxi, China)
 May 4, 2015: Chibi Maruko-chan's 25th Anniversary Special Exhibition in Taiwan – pre-ticketing press conference
 May 7, 2015: Press conference for the movie, 《槑计划》 (Foolish Plan) (Jeju Island, South Korea)
 May 19, 2015: Celebrity guest for Taiwan's Marvel Entertainment exhibition
 May 27, 2015: Press conference for Liaoning Television's new reality program, 《冲上云霄》 (Flying Man'') (Beijing, China)
 June 18, 2015: Press conference for the launch of Chibi Maruko-chan's 25th anniversary exhibition in Taiwan (Huashan 1914 Creative Park, Taipei, Taiwan)
 June 19, 2015: Celebrity guest for Philips event at Super Brand Mall (Lujiazui, Shanghai, China)
 June 20, 2015: Presenter at the 18th Shanghai International Film Festival (Shanghai, China)

References

External links
  Jiro Wang's Weibo microblog
  Jiro Wang's Instagram account
  Fahrenheit@HIM International Music
  Fahrenheit: Official Japan Site

1981 births
Living people
Taiwanese male television actors
Fahrenheit (Taiwanese band) members
Male actors from Taipei
Taiwanese male film actors
Musicians from Taipei
Taiwanese idols
21st-century Taiwanese male singers